Berwick railway station is located on the Pakenham line in Victoria, Australia. It serves the south-eastern Melbourne suburb of Berwick, and it opened on 8 October 1877.

History

Berwick station opened on 8 October 1877, when the railway line from Dandenong was extended to Pakenham. Like the suburb itself, the station was named after Berwick-upon-Tweed, Northumberland, England, the birthplace of Robert Gardiner, who was an early leaseholder in the area.

In 1956, the line between Berwick and Officer was duplicated, with a signal panel also installed at the station in that year. In 1962, duplication between Berwick and Narre Warren was provided.

In 1970, flashing light signals were provided at the former Clyde Road level crossing, which was located nearby in the Up direction of the station. On 12 October 1982, at around 11:15am, Hitachi carriage 137M, leading a Dandenong – Pakenham shuttle service, collided with a semi-trailer at the level crossing. The collision derailed 137M, flipping it on its side. 11 people were injured in the collision. 137M was later withdrawn due to the collision.

In 1986, boom barriers were provided at the former level crossing. During September 1988, the former No. 2 and No. 3 roass were removed. In December of that year, a number of points and signals were abolished.

In 1998, Berwick was upgraded to a Premium Station.

On 1 December 2018, the signal panel was abolished.

In early 2022, the Clyde Road level crossing was grade separated, as part of the Level Crossing Removal Project. The level crossing was removed by building a road underpass beneath the railway line. The grade separation works also included upgrading the bus interchange at the station. On 21 February of that year, Clyde Road reopened to vehicles.

Platforms and services

Berwick has one island platform with two faces. It is serviced by Metro Trains' Pakenham line services, as well as selected V/Line Traralgon services.

Platform 1:
  all stations and limited express services to Flinders Street
  one weekday morning V/Line service to Southern Cross (set down only)

Platform 2:
  all stations services to Pakenham
  one weekday afternoon V/Line service to Traralgon (pick up only)

By late 2025, it is planned that trains on the Pakenham line will be through-routed with those on the Sunbury line, via the new Metro Tunnel.

Transport links

Ventura Bus Lines operates thirteen routes via Berwick station, under contract to Public Transport Victoria:
 : to Hampton station
 : to Kingsmere Estate (Berwick)
 : to Berwick station (loop service via Berwick North and Narre Warren South)
 : to Berwick station (loop service via Narre Warren South and Berwick North)
 : to Eden Rise Shopping Centre
 : to Beaconsfield East
 : Emerald – Westfield Fountain Gate
 : to Berwick North
 : to Eden Rise Shopping Centre
 : to The Avenue Village Shopping Centre (Cranbourne North)
 : to Clyde
 : to Clyde North
 : to The Avenue Village Shopping Centre (Cranbourne North)

References

External links
 Victorian Railway Stations gallery
 Melway map at street-directory.com.au

Premium Melbourne railway stations
Railway stations in Melbourne
Railway stations in Australia opened in 1877
Railway stations in the City of Casey